Chiranji Lal Sharma (23 September 1923 – 12 December 2011) was a member of 7th Lok Sabha from Karnal (Lok Sabha constituency) in Haryana State, India. He was elected to 8th, 9th and 10th Lok Sabha from Karnal. He was born in Ahulana, District Sonepat, Haryana. He died in Gurgaon in 2011, aged 88.

References

1923 births
People from Sonipat district
India MPs 1984–1989
India MPs 1989–1991
India MPs 1991–1996
India MPs 1980–1984
People from Karnal district
Haryana politicians
Lok Sabha members from Haryana
2011 deaths